The Royal Falkland Islands Police (RFIP) is the territorial police force responsible for law enforcement within the Falkland Islands. The current Chief Police Officer is Superintendent Michael Luke. The Falkland Islands Police Force was granted the "Royal" prefix by Queen Elizabeth II on 1 January 1992.

History
The force was established on 1 November 1846 with the appointment of Francis Parry as Chief Constable. The Constables Ordinance 1846, which had been enacted by the colony's Legislative Council on 27 October of that year, created an organisation that has remained at the service of the public ever since. It was initially staffed by three officers - the Chief Constable, the Gaoler (responsible for prisoners), and the Night Constable (responsible for policing during the night).

The police station, which has remained the headquarters building since it was completed in 1873, is situated centrally in Stanley. The building, which has had several wooden extensions added over the years, was built of stone by the detachment of Royal Marines that were stationed in the colony at that time.

Today all serving police officers are based at Stanley police station or the military base. Historically local constables were based at Fox Bay (by 1900), and the Jason Islands (by 1920), with another at Grytviken in South Georgia (also by 1920) chiefly to prevent seal poaching.

The police station took a direct hit from a British missile during the Falklands War on 11 June 1982 and was severely damaged. The fabric of the building was repaired but after 135 years of continual service it was totally refurbished in 2008. This was completed in 2009 with the new jail being opened by the Princess Royal on 24 March 2009.

Operation

Communication is based on VHF FM radio and is encrypted. It is monitored from a force control room in Stanley. The use of a repeater greatly extends the range of coverage.

Codes of practice are published originating from the Criminal Justice Ordinance 1989. All equipment issued to officers and practices used to comply with Home Office and Association of Chief Police Officers (ACPO) guidelines.

In common with British police practice, officers are not routinely armed. Owing to the small size of the force, there are no permanent armed response units, although some officers are trained and certified as armed response officers.

Personnel
The RFIP has a total staff of 28, including sworn constables and support staff, for front desk and licensing duties.

The RFIP consists of:

a Superintendent (Chief Police Officer)
an Inspector, (Deputy)
a Detective Sergeant,
2 uniform Sergeants,
12 Police Constables, 
3 Detective Constables, 
8 Reserve Police Constables (similar to UK special constables but paid).

There are also four  police support staff:

Senior Clerk,
Licensing Officer,
2 Station Enquiry Officers.

Ranks
The force uses the following standard British policing ranks:

List
Superintendent
Inspector
Sergeant
Constable

The RFIP is headed by a Chief Police Officer, who holds the rank of Superintendent. The Chief Police Officer is assisted by a Deputy Chief Officer who holds the rank of Inspector.

Uniformed policing
Uniformed community policing is carried out by a team of 12 police constables and 8 reserve constables, supervised by two police sergeants.

Criminal Investigation Department
The island's permanent CID was formed in 2018. Previously criminal detection was undertaken by uniformed police officers. The CID is staffed by three detective constables and one detective sergeant.

Prison service
Until November 2014 the RFIP also provided prison services on the Falkland Islands. Since that time there has been a separate and dedicated prison service, but this is still located within the police station, working with the RFIP to provide custody and detention facilities. The prison service is staffed by a prison manager and four prison officers.

Other Falklands police services
Owing to the large military presence on the Falkland Islands there is always a contingent of Military Police - known as Joint Service Police & Security Unit (JSPSU), British Forces South Atlantic  - stationed on the island. As a matter of policy, all British Military Police officers from all three services assigned to the Falklands are also sworn in as RFIP reserve constables, so that they have full civil police powers during their tour of duty.

See also 
 International Criminal Police Organization (Interpol)

References

External links 
 

Falkland Islands
Politics of the Falkland Islands
Organizations established in 1846
Organizations with royal patronage
1846 establishments in the British Empire
1846 establishments in the United Kingdom
1846 establishments in the Falkland Islands